Jack W. Dorkin (born July 1866, at sea on board the SS Tamar) was an English professional footballer who played as a forward for Southampton St. Mary's in the 1890s.

Football career
Dorkin's early career took him to various parts of the country; his first recorded club was Ipswich Rangers in 1893. He subsequently played in Scotland with St Bernard's before joining the Royal Engineers at Chatham, where he represented the Army in a match against the Corinthians.

In January 1893, he was "bought out" of the Royal Engineers by Southampton St. Mary's, and became one of the club's first professional players. In the two seasons before the inauguration of the Southern League he was a regular selection at centre-forward and a prolific goal-scorer. In 1893–94, Dorkin played in the Qualifying Rounds of the FA Cup, a 3–1 victory against Uxbridge in Qualifying Round One, followed by a 2–1 defeat at Reading.He also appeared regularly in various local cup competitions, helping the Saints reach three finals, winning the Hampshire County Cricket Club Charity Cup, defeating the Royal Artillery 5–0 in the final.

In 1894, Southampton were one of the nine founder members of the Southern League, which had been created to enable clubs in southern England, who were not admitted to the Football League to play competitive football on a regular basis. By now, Dorkin was past his prime and only made his league debut near the end of the season, when he played and scored in each of the last three matches.

He retired from professional football in the summer of 1895. Two years later, he was persuaded to come out of retirement to take part in six-a-side tournament, but this ended with him breaking a leg. He made a brief comeback in November 1902 with Basingstoke and was later the coach/manager at Romsey Town.

Career outside sport
In partnership with former Southampton St. Mary's footballer and Hampshire cricketer Victor Barton, Dorkin ran a sports outfitters business in Southampton.

References

1866 births
Year of death missing
English footballers
Association football forwards
St Bernard's F.C. players
Royal Engineers A.F.C. players
Southampton F.C. players
Basingstoke Town F.C. players
Southern Football League players
Romsey Town F.C. managers
English football managers